A  or one thousand stitch is a belt or strip of cloth stitched 1000 times and given as a Shinto amulet by Japanese women and imperial subjects to soldiers going away to war.

Each end of the belt could feature strings, snaps or buttons that allowed it to be fastened around the waist; examples lacking these were often tucked into the waist. Other variations were never worn, but may have been folded and placed inside helmet liners, pockets or packs.

Construction and variations
 were most commonly made from white cloth and embroidered with 1000 red stitches, as the combination of white and red was considered to be lucky and auspicious. Yellow, red and green cloth were also used, and were combined with various coloured threads (such as yellow, gold, red and white) used for the embroidery. Tigers stitched or painted onto  were also common, as tigers were popularly known to be able to travel far away from home and return safely.

 took various forms, and were not limited exclusively to belts.

History
The custom of producing  originated during the First Sino-Japanese War of 1894–1895. In their earliest forms,  were small handkerchief sized pieces of square material, containing 1000 knots or stitches embroidered to strengthen the material, the implication being that this strength was passed along to the man carrying it.

In general,  and later varieties one thousand stitch belts were believed to confer courage, good luck and immunity from injury (especially bullets) to their wearers. Some Japanese soldiers rejected the belief that the  could protect them from harm, instead believing that the amulet would allow them to inflict the greatest damage upon the enemy before offering their own lives up in battle.

Production
 could be made by a soldier's mother, sister or wife, who would stand near their local temple, train station or department store and ask any female passerby to sew in a stitch or knot. During the height of WWII, women's organisations would gather to produce  en masse in order to meet demand.

According to tradition, any woman born in the year of the Tiger could sew either twelve stitches or a number of stitches identical to her age. Some belts were lined with the woman's hair, or the hair of multiple women, as an added form of protection, a custom that originated in folk beliefs on the island of Okinawa. Coins were also sewn into the belt for the perceived addition of protection.

In popular culture
  were featured in the 2006 movie Letters from Iwo Jima.
 Women in the animated film  stitch , both as women waiting for stitch contributions by other women outside of public buildings, and as a familial task making "good luck blankets".

See also

Good Luck Flag

References

Bibliography
 Imperial Japanese Good Luck Flags and One-Thousand Stitch Belts by Dr Michael A. Bortner, 2008, Schiffer Military Books,  

Imperial Japanese Army
Imperial Japanese Navy
Japanese clothing
Japanese stitching techniques
Japanese words and phrases
Shinto religious clothing
Japanese folk religion
Belts (clothing)